Yu Eung-bu (?~1456) was a military official of the early Joseon Dynasty and is remembered as one of the six martyred ministers. Yu was born in Pocheon; his date of birth and lineage are not known with certainty.

He served in the Gyeongwon garrison as Jeoljesa in 1448, and was the Commander of Uiju-mok in 1452.

In 1455, then King Danjong was overthrown by Sejo. Yu joined a conspiracy of high officials to restore Danjong. However, the plot was discovered shortly before it would have been executed in 1456. Yu and the other conspirators were arrested; after he failed  to repent under torture, he was executed.

A memorial to Yu stands today inside Chungmokdan located in Soheul-eup, Pocheon, Gyeonggi-do, South Korea.

See also
Joseon Dynasty politics
List of Koreans

References

1456 deaths
Joseon scholar-officials
Year of birth unknown